Congenital adrenal hyperplasia due to 21-hydroxylase deficiency, in all its forms, accounts for over 95% of diagnosed cases of congenital adrenal hyperplasia (CAH), and CAH in most contexts refers to 21-hydroxylase deficiency and different mutations related to enzyme impairment have been mapped on protein structure.

Presentation

Severe, early onset 21-hydroxylase deficient CAH
The two most serious neonatal consequences of 21-hydroxylase deficiency occur: life-threatening salt-wasting crises in the first month of life (for male and female infants alike) and severe virilization of female infants. The subdivision of the early onset CAH into salt-wasting and simple-virilizing forms, which is based on the capacity of the adrenal to produce small amounts of aldosterone in the simple-virilizing form, is often not clinically meaningful, because clinical presentations overlap and all patients lose salt to some degree.

Salt-wasting crises in infancy
The excessive amounts of adrenal testosterone produce little effect on the genitalia of male infants with severe CAH. If a male infant with CAH is not detected by newborn screening, he will appear healthy and normal and be quickly discharged home to his family.

However, the lack of aldosterone results in a high rate of sodium loss in the urine. Urinary sodium concentrations may exceed 50 mEq/L. With this rate of salt loss, the infant cannot maintain blood volume, and hyponatremic dehydration begins to develop by the end of the first week of life. Potassium and acid excretion are also impaired when mineralocorticoid activity is deficient, and hyperkalemia and metabolic acidosis gradually develop. Ability to maintain circulation is further limited by the effect of cortisol deficiency. The early symptoms are spitting and poor weight gain, but most infants with severe CAH develop vomiting, severe dehydration, and circulatory collapse (shock) by the second or third week of life.

When brought to a hospital, the 1- to 3-week-old infant will be both underweight and dehydrated by appearance. Blood pressure may be low. Basic chemistries will reveal hyponatremia, with a serum Na+ typically between 105 and 125 mEq/L. Hyperkalemia in these infants can be extreme—levels of K+ above 10 mEq/L are not unusual—as can the degree of metabolic acidosis. Hypoglycemia may be present. This is termed a salt-wasting crisis and rapidly causes death if not treated.

As ill as these infants can be, they respond rapidly to treatment with hydrocortisone and intravenous saline and dextrose quickly restores blood volume, blood pressure, and body sodium content, and reverses the hyperkalemia. With appropriate treatment, most infants are out of danger within 24 hours.

Virilization of female infants
It is the 21-hydroxylase enzyme that is essential in conversion of progesterone and 17α-hydroxyprogesterone into 11-deoxycorticosterone and 11-deoxycortisol, respectively. This process is done through hydroxylation at C-21 position.
It was described in at least 1953 that impaired steroid hydroxylation at C-21 position happens in congenital adrenal hyperplasia and is accompanied by excessive amounts of 17α-hydroxyprogesterone that leads to virilism.

In the insufficiency of 21-hydroxylase to participate in the biosynthesis of cortisol, the 21-hydroxylation in the zona fasciculata of the adrenal cortex is impaired, so 17α-hydroxyprogesterone and progesterone will not be properly converted into 11-deoxycortisol and 11-deoxycorticosterone, respectively − the precursors for cortisol and aldosterone. As the plasma concentration of cortisol and aldosterone decreases, ACTH levels increase, leading to excessive production and accumulation of cortisol precursors (especially 17α-hydroxyprogesterone), which are eventually transferred to androsterone and testosterone. Other androgens may be additionally produced from 17α-hydroxyprogesterone, due to its elevated levels, that leads, inter alia, to its 5α-reduction. These additional androgens are produced via the so-called "backdoor pathway". For example, in this "backdoor" pathway, 5α-dihydrotestosterone is produced with roundabout of testosterone as an intermediate product. Some of the androgens produced by the backdoor pathway are those that cannot be converted to estrogens by aromatase, causing prenatal virilization, and making them the dominant androgens in classic 21-hydroxylase deficiency.

Virilization of genetically female (XX) infants usually produces obvious genital ambiguity. Inside the pelvis, the ovaries are normal and since they have not been exposed to testicular antimullerian hormone (AMH), the uterus, fallopian tubes, upper vagina, and other mullerian structures are normally formed as well. However, the high levels of testosterone in the blood can enlarge the phallus, partially or completely close the vaginal opening, enclose the urethral groove so that it opens at the base of the phallus, on the shaft or even at the tip like a boy. Testosterone can cause the labial skin to become as thin and rugate as a scrotum, but cannot produce palpable gonads (i.e., testes) in the folds.

Thus, depending on the severity of hyperandrogenism, a female infant can be mildly affected, obviously ambiguous, or so severely virilized as to appear to be a male. Andrea Prader devised the following Prader scale as a way of describing the degree of virilization.
 An infant at stage 1 has a mildly large clitoris and slightly reduced vaginal opening size. This degree may go unnoticed or may be simply assumed to be within normal variation.
 Stages 2 and 3 represent progressively more severe degrees of virilization. The genitalia are obviously abnormal to the eye, with a phallus intermediate in size and a small vaginal opening.
 Stage 4 looks more male than female, with an empty scrotum and a phallus the size of a normal penis, but not quite free enough of the perineum to be pulled onto the abdomen toward the umbilicus (i.e., what is termed a chordee in a male). The single small urethral/vaginal opening at the base or on the shaft of the phallus would be considered a hypospadias in a male. X-rays taken after dye injection into this opening reveal the internal connection with the upper vagina and uterus. This common opening can predispose to urinary obstruction and infection.
 Stage 5 denotes complete male virilization, with a normally formed penis with the urethral opening at or near the tip. The scrotum is normally formed but empty. The internal pelvic organs include normal ovaries and uterus, and the vagina connects internally with the urethra as in Stage 4. These infants are not visibly ambiguous, and are usually assumed to be ordinary boys with undescended testes. In most cases, the diagnosis of CAH is not suspected until signs of salt-wasting develop a week later.

When the genitalia are determined to be ambiguous at birth, CAH is one of the leading diagnostic possibilities. Evaluation reveals the presence of a uterus, extreme elevation of 17OHP, levels of testosterone approaching or exceeding the male range but low AMH levels. The karyotype is that of an ordinary female: 46,XX. With this information, the diagnosis of CAH is readily made and female sex confirmed.

Evaluation of ambiguous genitalia is described in detail elsewhere. In most cases it is possible to confirm and assign female sex within 12–36 hours of birth. The exception are the rare, completely virilized genetic females (Prader stage 5), who present the most challenging assignment and surgery dilemmas, discussed below.

When the degree of ambiguity is obvious, corrective surgery is usually offered and performed. As reconstructive surgery on infant genitalia has become a focus of controversy, the issues are described in more detail below.

Reduced fertility

Testicular adrenal rest tumors 
Infertility observed in adult males with congenital adrenal hyperplasia (CAH) has been associated with testicular adrenal rest tumors (TART) that may originate during childhood. TART in prepubertal males with classic CAH could be found during childhood (20%). Martinez-Aguayo et al. reported differences in markers of gonadal function in a subgroup of patients, especially in those with inadequate control. Early glucocorticoid therapy may be beneficial to the reduction of TART.

Female fertility 
Women with classic CAH have statistically reduced fertility, especially those with the salt-losing form. Live birth rate is 33–50% in simple virilized form of CAH, and 0–10% in most severe salt-wasting form. In nonclassic form of CAH the live birth is 63–90%, similar to the age-matched control groups.

Sex assignment issues and controversies
Classical CAH leads to female pseudohermaphroditism at birth, and is the most common case of sex ambiguity, the second one is mixed gonadal dysgenesis. Most commonly, at birth, the phallus enlarges, so it is larger than normal female but smaller than normal male. Instead of separate urethral and vaginal openings, there is an urogenital sinus that is often covered by tissue resulting from the posterior fusion of the labioscrotal ridges. Therefore, different degrees of external genital abnormalities can be found, ranging from normal perineum to penile urethra.

There are no difficulties assigning appropriate sex for most infants with CAH. Genetic males have normal male genitalia and gonads and simply need hormone replacement. Most virilized females are assigned and raised as girls even if their genitalia are ambiguous or look more male than female. They have normal ovaries and uterus and potential fertility with hormone replacement and surgery. However, the dilemmas surrounding sex assignment of the most severely virilized XX infants have helped shape our understanding of gender identity and sexual orientation, and continue to be a subject of debate.

Until the 1950s, some virilized XX infants were assigned and raised as girls, and some as boys. Most developed gender identities congruent with their sex of rearing. In a few cases of male rearing, a sex reassignment was attempted in mid-childhood when newly discovered karyotyping revealed "female" chromosomes. These reassignments were rarely successful, leading John Money and other influential psychologists and physicians to conclude that gender identity was (1) unrelated to chromosomes, (2) primarily a result of social learning, and (3) could not be easily changed after infancy.

By the 1960s, CAH was well understood, karyotyping was routine, and standard management was to assign and raise all children with CAH according to their gonads and karyotypes, no matter how virilized. Markedly virilized girls were usually referred to a pediatric surgeon, often a pediatric urologist for a reconstructive vaginoplasty and clitoral reduction or recession—surgery to create or enlarge a vaginal opening and reduce the size or protrusion of the clitoris. This approach was designed to preserve fertility for both sexes and remains the standard management, but two aspects of this management have been challenged: assignment of completely virilized genetic females and the value and age of corrective surgery.

The first questions about assignment were raised in the early 1980s when Money and others reported an unexpectedly high rate of failure to achieve normal adult sexual relationships (i.e., heterosexual orientation, marriage, and children) in grown women with CAH (though all had female gender identities). However, the sample was small, and results seemed interpretable in many ways: selection bias, early hormone effects on orientation, or sexual dysfunction created by residual body abnormalities or by the genital surgery itself. From a perspective two decades later, the report was one of the first pieces of evidence that the standard management paradigm was not always producing hoped-for outcomes.

Despite these concerns, no significant opposition to standard management arose until the mid-1990s, when a confluence of evidence and opinion from several sources led to a re-examination of outcomes. Several intersex support and advocacy groups (e.g., the Intersex Society of North America) began to publicly criticize infant genital surgery based on unsatisfactory outcomes of some adults who had been operated on as infants. Their complaints were that they had reduced ability to enjoy sexual relations or that they resented not having had the choice of gender assignment or surgical reconstruction left until they were old enough to participate. (See History of intersex surgery.)

In 1997, influential articles by Reiner, Diamond, and Sigmundson advocated consideration of (1) male sex assignment in the unambiguously male XX infants (most of whom are considered male until the CAH is recognized at 1–2 weeks of age), and (2) delaying reconstructive surgery until the patient is old enough to participate in the decision. (See Ambiguous genitalia and Intersex for more on this debate, as well as complete citations.)

Although the standard management approach remains "standard", more time and consideration are being given in many cases to explaining alternatives to parents and a small number of XX children with unambiguously male external genitalia are again being raised as boys.

Late onset (nonclassical) CAH
The androgen excess is mild enough that virilization is not apparent or goes unrecognized at birth and in early childhood. However, androgen levels are above normal and slowly rise during childhood, producing noticeable effects between 2 and 9 years of age.

Appearance of pubic hair in mid-childhood is the most common feature that leads to evaluation and diagnosis. Other accompanying features are likely to be tall stature and accelerated bone age (often 3–5 years ahead). Often present are increased muscle mass, acne, and adult body odor. In boys the penis will be enlarged. Mild clitoral enlargement may occur in girls, and sometimes a degree of prenatal virilization is recognized that may have gone unnoticed in infancy.

The principal goals of treatment of nonclassical CAH are to preserve as much growth as possible and to prevent central precocious puberty if it has not already been triggered. These are more difficult challenges than in CAH detected in infancy because moderate levels of androgens will have had several years to advance bone maturation and to trigger central puberty before the disease is detected.

A diagnosis of nonclassical CAH is usually confirmed by discovering extreme elevations of 17α-hydroxyprogesterone along with moderately high testosterone levels. A cosyntropin stimulation test may be needed in mild cases, but usually the random levels of 17OHP are high enough to confirm the diagnosis.

Elevated 17α-hydroxyprogesterone may activate androgen "backdoor" pathway, that leads to excess of 5α-dihydrotestosterone and other potent androgens, with normal levels of testosterone. See also: androgen backdoor pathway.

The mainstay of treatment is suppression of adrenal testosterone production by a glucocorticoid such as hydrocortisone. Mineralocorticoid is only added in cases where the plasma renin activity is high.

A third key aspect of management is suppression of central precocious puberty if it has begun. The usual clues to central puberty in boys are that the testes are pubertal in size, or that testosterone remains elevated even when the 17OHP has been reduced toward normal. In girls central puberty is less often a problem, but breast development would be the main clue. Central precocious puberty is suppressed when appropriate by leuprolide.

As outlined above, recent additions to treatment to preserve growth include aromatase inhibition to slow bone maturation by reducing the amount of testosterone converted to estradiol, and use of blockers of estrogen for the same purpose.

Once adrenal suppression has been achieved, the patient needs stress steroid coverage as described above for significant illness or injury.

Other alleles result in even milder degrees of hyperandrogenism that may not even cause problems in males and may not be recognized until adolescence or later in females. Mild androgen effects in young women may include hirsutism, acne, or anovulation (which in turn can cause infertility). Testosterone levels in these women may be mildly elevated, or simply above average. These clinical features are those of polycystic ovary syndrome (PCOS), and a small percentage of women with PCOS are found to have late-onset CAH when investigated.

Diagnosis of late-onset CAH may be suspected from a high 17α-hydroxyprogesterone level, but some cases are so mild that the elevation is only demonstrable after cosyntropin stimulation. Treatment may involve a combination of very low dose glucocorticoid to reduce adrenal androgen production and any of various agents to block the androgen effects and/or induce ovulation.

Late-onset CAH was originally characterized in 1957 by French biochemist Jacques Decourt, but the association with mild 21-hydroxylase deficiency called nonclassical 21-hydroxylase deficiency, which is characterized by diverse hyperandrogenic symptoms appearing postnatally in males and females, was first described in 1979 by Maria New. New since then have studied ways to reduce androgen excess and found out that treatment with dexamethasone 0.25 mg orally every evening reversed acne and irregular menstruation in 3 months, but hirsutism required up to 30 months. Dexamethasone has glucocorticoid activity, and potent ACTH-suppression properties within the hypothalamic–pituitary–adrenal axis. Lower ACTH leads to reduced production of all the steroids, including androgens. According to 2018 Clinical Practice Guideline, glucocorticoid treatment is not recommended in asymptomatic individuals, however, if the symptoms of androgen excess are sufficient, dexamethasone treatment may be prescribed. Another treatment option is oral contraceptive pills.

Genetics

The CYP 21A2 gene for the P450c21 enzyme (also known as 21-hydroxylase) is at 6p21.3, amid genes HLA B and HLA DR coding for the major human histocompatibility loci (HLA). CYP21A2 is paired with a nonfunctional pseudogene CYP21A1P. Scores of abnormal alleles of CYP21A2 have been documented, most arising from recombinations of homologous regions of CYP21A2 and CYP21A1P. The 21-hydroxylase deficiency may be caused by macrodeletions of about 30 Kb, which includes not only most of the 5′ region of the CYP21A2 gene, but also all of the C4B gene and 3′ regions of the CYP21A1P pseudogene. Duplications of CYP21A1P pseudogene and C4B gene are often associated with nonclassic 21-hydroxylase deficiency. Due to the high degree of homology between the CYP21A2 gene and the CYP21A1P pseudogene, and the complexity of the locus, research on the molecular level is difficult.

Differences in residual enzyme activity of the various alleles account for the various degrees of severity of the disease. Inheritance of all forms of 21-hydroxylase CAH is autosomal recessive.

Persons affected by any forms of the disease have two abnormal alleles, and both parents are usually heterozygotes (or carriers).  When both parents carry an abnormal allele, each child has a 25% chance of having the disease, a 50% chance of being a carrier like the parents, and a 25% chance of having two normal genes.

It is possible to test for heterozygosity by measuring 17α-hydroxyprogesterone elevation after ACTH stimulation.

More than 200 disease-causing variants within the CYP21A2 gene have been identified so far that lead to 21-hydroxylase deficiency if at least two of these variants are present as compound heterozygous. There is a good correlation between the genotype and phenotype. As a result, the CYP21A2 genotyping has high diagnostic value. However, the genotyping of the CYP21A2 gene is prone to errors, especially due to the closely located and highly homologous pseudogene CYP21A1P and the complex duplications, deletions and rearrangements within the chromosome 6p21.3. That's why CYP21A2 genotyping, interpretation of the results, and adequate genetic counseling for patients and their families requires deep understanding of CYP21A2 genetics.

Pathophysiology

The enzyme P450c21, commonly referred to as 21-hydroxylase (21-OH), is embedded in the smooth endoplasmic reticulum of the cells of the adrenal cortex. It catalyzes hydroxylation of 17α-hydroxyprogesterone (17OHP) to 11-deoxycortisol in the glucocorticoid pathway, which starts from pregnenolone and finishes with cortisol. It also catalyzes hydroxylation of progesterone to 11-deoxycorticosterone (DOC) in the mineralocorticoid pathway on its way from pregnenolone to aldosterone.

Deficient activity of this enzyme reduces the efficiency of cortisol synthesis, with consequent hyperplasia of the adrenal cortex and elevation of ACTH levels. ACTH stimulates uptake of cholesterol and synthesis of pregnenolone. Steroid precursors up to and including progesterone, 17α-hydroxypregnenolone, and especially 17α-hydroxyprogesterone accumulate in the adrenal cortex and in circulating blood. Blood levels of 17OHP can reach 10-1000 times the normal concentration.

Since 21-hydroxylase activity is not involved in synthesis of androgens, a substantial fraction of the large amounts of 17α-hydroxypregnenolone is diverted to synthesis of DHEA, androstenedione, and testosterone beginning in the third month of fetal life in both sexes.

Synthesis of aldosterone is also dependent on 21-hydroxylase activity. Although fetal production is impaired, it causes no prenatal effects, as the placental connection allows maternal blood to "dialyze" the fetus and maintain both electrolyte balance and blood volume.

Diagnosis
Since CAH is an autosomal recessive disease, most children with CAH are born to parents unaware of the risk and with no family history. Each child will have a 25% chance of being born with the disease.

Classification
The condition can be classified into "salt-wasting", "simple virilizing", and "nonclassical" forms.

The salt-wasting and simple virilizing types are sometimes grouped together as "classical".

Newborn screening
Conditions justifying newborn screening for any disorder include (1) a simple test with an acceptable sensitivity and specificity, (2) a dire consequence if not diagnosed early, (3) an effective treatment if diagnosed, and (4) a frequency in the population high enough to justify the expense. In the last decade more states and countries are adopting newborn screening for salt-wasting CAH due to 21-hydroxylase deficiency, which leads to death in the first month of life if not recognized.

The salt-wasting form of CAH has an incidence of 1 in 15,000 births and is potentially fatal within a month if untreated. Steroid replacement is a simple, effective treatment. However, the screening test itself is less than perfect.

While the 17α-hydroxyprogesterone level is easy to measure and sensitive (rarely missing real cases), the test has a poorer specificity. Screening programs in the United States have reported that 99% of positive screens turn out to be false positives upon investigation of the infant. This is a higher rate of false positives than the screening tests for many other congenital metabolic diseases.

Measurement of 17α-hydroxyprogesterone (17α-OHP) by LC-MS/MS reduces false positive rate in newborn screening in comparison to measurement by immunoassays. 17α-OHP steroid precursors and their sulphated conjugates which are present in the first two days after birth in healthy infants and longer in pre-term neonates, cross-react in immunoassays with 17α-OHP, giving falsely high 17α-OHP levels.

When a positive result is detected, the infant must be referred to a pediatric endocrinologist to confirm or disprove the diagnosis. Since most infants with salt-wasting CAH become critically ill by 2 weeks of age, the evaluation must be done rapidly despite the high false positive rate.

Levels of 17α-hydroxyprogesterone, androstenedione, and cortisol may play a role in screening.

Additional markers
While 17α-hydroxyprogesterone with or without ACTH stimulation is the main marker for 21-hydroxylase deficiency, other markers have been proposed, with various degrees of acceptance:
 21-Deoxycortisol is elevated in 21-hydroxylase deficiency. However, it is not elevated in preterm infants or in other forms of congenital adrenal hyperplasia. Unlike 17α-hydroxyprogesterone, 21-deoxycortisol is not produced in the gonads and is uniquely adrenal-derived. Consequently, 21-deoxycortisol it is a more specific marker of the 21-hydroxylase deficiency than 17α-hydroxyprogesterone. Even so, 21-deoxycortisol measurement has not been commonly performed by laboratories until 2019. Still, 21-deoxycortisol can be a key screening marker for 21-hydroxylase deficiency in newborn screening. 
 21-Deoxycorticosterone, also known as 11β-hydroxyprogesterone (11β-OHP), have been proposed as a marker in 1987. A study in 2017 has shown that in subjects with 21-hydroxylase deficiency, serum 11β-OHP concentrations range from 0.012 to 3.37 ng/mL, while in control group it was below detection limit of 0.012 ng/mL. This marker did not gain acceptance as of 2020 due to the fact that the test for the levels of this steroid is not routinely offered by diagnostic laboratories.
 Progesterone levels are higher in CAH subjects. A study has revealed that serum progesterone concentrations in boys (10 days to 18 years old) with 21-hydroxylase deficiency reached levels up to 10.14 ng/mL, i.e. similar to female luteal values, while in the control group of boys average level was 0.07 ng/mL (0.22 nmol/L), with values ranging from 0.05 to 0.40 ng/mL. The authors of the study propose to use progesterone as an additional marker for 21-hydroxylase deficiency. The study shows that the progesterone levels in CAH and non-CAH females are the same as in CAH and non-CAH males respectively – it is the condition that affects progesterone levels, not the sex, but for women between menarch and menopause, progesterone should be measured in days 3–5 of the cycle to have diagnostic value – the same condition also applies for 17α-hydroxyprogesterone. The specificity of progesterone as a marker of 21-hydroxylase deficiency, as opposed to deficiency of other enzymes involved in steroid pathways, was not well studied as of 2020.
 Cortisol is one of the two main final products of 21-hydroxylase, and the deficiency of this enzyme may lead to a certain degree of cortisol deficiency. Cortisol levels are lower in CAH subjects, on average, however, in milder cases cortisol levels can be normal, but as of 2020, this has not been yet well studied. Cortisol measurement using immunoassays is prone to cross-reactivity with various substances including 21-deoxycortisol that raises due to 21-hydroxylase deficiency, leading to falsely high cortisol levels when the true cortisol is actually low. The selectivity offered by liquid chromatography-tandem mass spectrometry (LC-MS/MS) has largely overcome these limitations. As a result, the use of LC-MS/MS instead of immunoassays in cortisol measurement aims to provide greater specificity.
 11-Deoxycortisol is a direct product of 17α-hydroxyprogesterone, with 21-hydroxylase catalyzing the reaction, and an intermediate product towards cortisol pathway. Reduced 21-hydroxylase activity leads to decreased levels of 11-deoxycortisol, but not all laboratories specify minimum reference value it, since it is mostly used as a biomarker for 11β-hydroxylase deficiency, where 11-deoxycortisol levels increase dramatically, so the laboratories may only specify the maximum reference value.

Treatment

Prenatal treatment
As of 2018, Clinical Practice Guideline advise that clinicians continue to regard prenatal therapy as experimental.

Because the period during which fetal genitalia may become virilized begins about 6 weeks after conception, prenatal treatment to avoid virilization must be started by 6 to 7 weeks.

Application of dexamethasone in prenatal treatment 
Adrenal glands of female fetuses with CAH begin producing excess androgens by the 9th week of gestation. The most important aspects of virilization (urogenital closure and phallic urethra) occur between 8 and 12 weeks. Theoretically, if enough glucocorticoid could be supplied to the fetus to reduce adrenal testosterone production by the 9th week, virilization could be prevented and the difficult decision about timing of surgery avoided.

The challenge of preventing severe virilization of girls is twofold: detection of CAH at the beginning of the pregnancy, and delivery of an effective amount of glucocorticoid to the fetus without causing harm to the mother.

The first problem has not yet been entirely solved, but it has been shown that if dexamethasone is taken by a pregnant woman, enough can cross the placenta to suppress fetal adrenal function.

At present no program screens for risk in families who have not yet had a child with CAH. For families desiring to avoid virilization of a second child, the current strategy is to start dexamethasone as soon as a pregnancy has been confirmed even though at that point the chance that the pregnancy is a girl with CAH is only 12.5%. Dexamethasone is taken by the mother each day until it can be safely determined whether she is carrying an affected girl.

Whether the fetus is an affected girl can be determined by chorionic villus sampling at 9–11 weeks of gestation, or by amniocentesis at 15–18 weeks gestation. In each case the fetal sex can be determined quickly, and if the fetus is a male the dexamethasone can be discontinued. If female, fetal DNA is analyzed to see if she carries one of the known abnormal alleles of the CYP21 gene. If so, dexamethasone is continued for the remainder of the pregnancy at a dose of about 1 mg daily.

Most mothers who have followed this treatment plan have experienced at least mild cushingoid effects from the glucocorticoid but have borne daughters whose genitalia are much less virilized.

Dexamethasone is used as an off-label early prenatal treatment for the symptoms of CAH in female fetuses, but it does not treat the underlying congenital disorder. A 2007 Swedish clinical trial found that treatment may cause cognitive and behavioural defects, but the small number of test subjects means the study cannot be considered definitive. A 2012 American study found no negative short-term outcomes, but "lower cognitive processing in CAH girls and women with long-term DEX exposure." Administration of pre-natal dexamethasone has been the subject of controversy over issues of informed consent and because treatment must predate a clinical diagnosis of CAH in the female fetus, especially because in utero dexamethasone may cause metabolic problems that are not evident until later in life; Swedish clinics ceased recruitment for research in 2010.

The treatment has also raised concerns in LGBT and bioethics communities following publication of an essay posted to the forum of the Hastings Center, and research in the Journal of Bioethical Inquiry, which found that pre-natal treatment of female fetuses was suggested to prevent those fetuses from becoming lesbians after birth, may make them more likely to engage in "traditionally" female-identified behaviour and careers, and more interested in bearing and raising children. Citing a known attempt by a man using his knowledge of the fraternal birth order effect to avoid having a homosexual son by using a surrogate, the essayists (Professor Alice Dreger of Northwestern University's Feinberg School of Medicine, Professor Ellen Feder of American University and attorney Anne Tamar-Mattis) suggest that pre-natal "dex" treatments constitute the first known attempt to use in utero protocols to reduce the incidence of homosexuality and bisexuality in humans. Research on the use of prenatal hormone treatments to prevent homosexuality stretches back to the early 1990s or earlier.

Since CAH is a recessive gene, both the mother and father must be recessive carriers of CAH for a child to have CAH. Due to advances in modern medicine, those couples with the recessive CAH genes have an option to prevent CAH in their offspring through preimplantation genetic diagnosis (PGD). In PGD, the egg is fertilized outside the woman's body in a petri dish (IVF). On the 3rd day, when the embryo has developed from one cell to about 4 to 6 cells, one of those cells is removed from the embryo without harming the embryo. The embryo continues to grow until day 5 when it is either frozen or implanted into the mother. Meanwhile, the removed cell is analyzed to determine if the embryo has CAH. If the embryo is determined to have CAH, the parents may make a decision as to whether they wish to have it implanted in the mother or not.

Meta-analysis of the studies supporting the use of dexamethasone on CAH at-risk fetuses found "less than one half of one percent of published 'studies' of this intervention were regarded as being of high enough quality to provide meaningful data for a meta-analysis. Even these four studies were of low quality ... in ways so slipshod as to breach professional standards of medical ethics" and "there were no data on long-term follow-up of physical and metabolic outcomes in children exposed to dexamethasone".

Long-term management of CAH
Management of infants and children with CAH is complex and warrants long-term care in a pediatric endocrine clinic. After the diagnosis is confirmed, and any salt-wasting crisis averted or reversed, major management issues include:

 Initiating and monitoring hormone replacement
 Stress coverage, crisis prevention, parental education
 Reconstructive surgery
 Optimizing growth
 Optimizing androgen suppression and fertility in women with CAH

Hormone replacement
The primary goals of hormone replacement are to protect from adrenal insufficiency and to suppress the excessive adrenal androgen production.

Glucocorticoids are provided to all children and adults with all but the mildest and latest-onset forms of CAH. The glucocorticoids provide a reliable substitute for cortisol, thereby reducing ACTH levels. Reducing ACTH also reduces the stimulus for continued hyperplasia and overproduction of androgens. In other words, glucocorticoid replacement is the primary method of reducing the excessive adrenal androgen production in both sexes. A number of glucocorticoids are available for therapeutic use. Hydrocortisone or liquid prednisolone is preferred in infancy and childhood, and prednisone or dexamethasone are often more convenient for adults.

The glucocorticoid dose is typically started at the low end of physiologic replacement (6–12 mg/m2) but is adjusted throughout childhood to prevent both growth suppression from too much glucocorticoid and androgen escape from too little. Serum levels of 17α-hydroxyprogesterone, testosterone, androstenedione, and other adrenal steroids are followed for additional information, but may not be entirely normalized even with optimal treatment. (See Glucocorticoid for more on this topic.) However, the currently used glucocorticoid therapy methods may lead to unphysiological doses that, in addition to the problems caused by overexposure of androgens, can harm health. Various clinical results, besides the steroids, require regular monitoring. The negative consequences are primarily the result of non-physiological glucocorticoid replacement. During illness or physical or mental stress, the demand for cortisol can increase, sometimes leading to adrenal crises. As current glucocorticoid therapy regiments fail to replicate the physiologic circadian rhythm and the glucocorticoids are often administered at a higher dose to treat androgen excess, the long-term consequences of the therapy, such as decreased bone density and an increased cardiometabolic risk profile, should be addressed; other consequences of CAH such as impaired quality of life and affected mental health should be taken into consideration; periodic assessments and monitoring of patients should take place in specialized centers to detect and treat potential complications early. Clinical studies are underway to find ways to better mimic the normal circadian rhythm of cortisol secretion and to reduce the total dose of glucocorticoids.

Mineralocorticoids are replaced in all infants with salt-wasting and in most patients with elevated renin levels. Fludrocortisone is the only pharmaceutically available mineralocorticoid and is usually used in doses of 0.05 to 2 mg daily. Electrolytes, renin, and blood pressure levels are followed to optimize the dose.

Stress coverage, crisis prevention, parental education
Even after diagnosis and initiation of treatment, a small percentage of children and adults with infancy or childhood onset CAH die of adrenal crisis . Deaths from this are entirely avoidable if the child and family understand that the daily glucocorticoids cannot be allowed to be interrupted by an illness. When a person is well, missing a dose, or even several doses, may produce little in the way of immediate symptoms. However, glucocorticoid needs are increased during illness and stress, and missed doses during an illness such as the "flu" (or viral gastroenteritis) can lead within hours to reduced blood pressure, shock, and death.

To prevent this, all persons taking replacement glucocorticoids are taught to increase their doses in the event of illness, surgery, severe injury, or severe exhaustion. More importantly, they are taught that vomiting warrants an injection within hours of hydrocortisone (e.g., SoluCortef) or other glucocorticoid. This recommendation applies to both children and adults. Because young children are more susceptible to vomiting illnesses than adults, pediatric endocrinologists usually teach parents how to give hydrocortisone injections.

As an additional precaution, persons with adrenal insufficiency are advised to wear a medical identification tag or carry a wallet card to alert those who may be providing emergency medical care of the urgent need for glucocorticoids.

Reconstructive surgery
Surgery need never be considered for genetically male (XY) infants because the excess androgens do not produce anatomic abnormality. However, surgery for severely virilized XX infants is often performed and has become a subject of debate in the last decade.

Surgical reconstruction of abnormal genitalia has been offered to parents of severely virilized girls with CAH since the first half of the 20th century. The purposes of surgery have generally been a combination of the following:

 To make the external genitalia look more female than male
 To make it possible for these girls to participate in normal sexual intercourse when they grow up
 To improve their chances of fertility
 To reduce the frequency of urinary infections

In the 1950s and 1960s, surgery often involved clitorectomy (removal of most of the clitoris), an operation that also reduced genital sensation. In the 1970s, new operative methods were developed to preserve innervation and clitoral function. However, a number of retrospective surveys in the last decade suggest that (1) sexual enjoyment is reduced in many women even after nerve-sparing procedures, and (2) women with CAH who have not had surgery also have a substantial rate of sexual dysfunction. (See Intersex surgery for an overview of procedures and potential complications, and History of intersex surgery for a fuller discussion of the controversies.) Many patient advocates and surgeons argue for deferring surgery until adolescence or later, while some surgeons continue to argue that infant surgery has advantages.

Optimizing growth in CAH
It is unclear what concentration of adrenal androgens is best for normal growth, puberty, and bone health.

One of the challenging aspects of long-term management is optimizing growth so that a child with CAH achieves his or her height potential because both undertreatment and overtreatment can reduce growth or the remaining time for growth. While glucocorticoids are essential for health, dosing is always a matter of approximation. In even mildly excessive amounts, glucocorticoids slow growth. On the other hand, adrenal androgens are readily converted to estradiol, which accelerates bone maturation and can lead to early epiphyseal closure. This narrow target of optimal dose is made more difficult to obtain by the imperfect replication of normal diurnal plasma cortisol levels produced by 2 or 3 oral doses of hydrocortisone. As a consequence, average height losses of about 4 inches (10 cm) have been reported with traditional management.

Traditionally, pediatric endocrinologists have tried to optimize growth by measuring a child every few months to assess current rate of growth, by checking the bone age every year or two, by periodically measuring 17OHP and testosterone levels as indicators of adrenal suppression, and by using hydrocortisone for glucocorticoid replacement rather than longer-acting prednisone or dexamethasone.

The growth problem is even worse in the simple virilizing forms of CAH which are detected when premature pubic hair appears in childhood, because the bone age is often several years advanced at the age of diagnosis. While a boy (or girl) with simple virilizing CAH is taller than peers at that point, he will have far fewer years remaining to grow, and may go from being a very tall 7-year-old to a 62-inch 13-year-old who has completed growth. Even with adrenal suppression, many of these children will have already had central precocious puberty triggered by the prolonged exposure of the hypothalamus to the adrenal androgens and estrogens. If this has begun, it may be advantageous to suppress puberty with a gonadotropin-releasing hormone agonist such as leuprolide to slow continuing bone maturation.

In recent years some newer approaches to optimizing growth have been researched and are beginning to be used. It is possible to reduce the effects of androgens on the body by blocking the receptors with an antiandrogen such as flutamide and by reducing the conversion of testosterone to estradiol. This conversion is mediated by aromatase and can be inhibited by aromatase blockers such as testolactone. Blocking the effects and conversions of estrogens will allow use of lower doses of glucocorticoids with less risk of acceleration of bone maturation. Other proposed interventions have included bilateral adrenalectomy to remove the androgen sources, or growth hormone treatment to enhance growth.

Preventing hyperandrogenism and optimizing fertility
As growth ends, management in girls with CAH changes focus to optimizing reproductive function. Both excessive testosterone from the adrenals and excessive glucocorticoid treatment can disrupt ovulation, resulting in irregularity of menses or amenorrhea, as well as infertility. Continued monitoring of hormone balance and careful readjustment of glucocorticoid dose can usually restore fertility, but as a group, women with CAH have a lower fertility rate than a comparable population.

CAH has little effect on male fertility unless an adult stops taking his glucocorticoid medication entirely for an extended time, in which case excessive adrenal testosterone may reduce testicular production as well as spermatogenesis.

Psychosexual development and issues
Nearly all mammals display sex-dimorphic reproductive and sexual behavior (e.g., lordosis and mounting in rodents). Much research has made it clear that prenatal and early postnatal androgens play a role in the differentiation of most mammalian brains. Experimental manipulation of androgen levels in utero or shortly after birth can alter adult reproductive behavior.

Girls and women with CAH constitute the majority of genetic females with normal internal reproductive hormones who have been exposed to male levels of testosterone throughout their prenatal lives. Milder degrees of continuing androgen exposure continue throughout childhood and adolescence as a consequence of the imperfections of current glucocorticoid treatment for CAH. The psychosexual development of these girls and women has been analyzed as evidence of the role of androgens in human sex-dimorphic behaviors.

Girls with CAH have repeatedly been reported to spend more time with "sex-atypical" toys and "rough-and-tumble" play than unaffected sisters. These differences continue into adolescence, as expressed in social behaviors, leisure activities, and career interests. Interest in babies and becoming mothers is significantly lower by most measures.

Cognitive effects are less clear. Altered fetal and postnatal exposure to androgens, as well as glucocorticoid therapy, affect brain development and function. Compared to healthy girls, those with classic CAH have more aggressive behavior but have better spatial navigation abilities, and the amygdala activation patterns differ between affected and healthy girls. Glucocorticoid therapy in CAH impairs working memory and causes brain changes, including white matter hyperintensities, suggesting a reduction in white matter structural integrity.

However, gender identity of girls and women with CAH is most frequently observed to be female. Sexual orientation is more mixed, though the majority are heterosexual. In one study, 27% of women with CAH were rated as bisexual in their orientations.

A 2020 survey of 57 females with life-long experience of CAH and 132 parents of females with CAH in the United States revealed that majority of participants do not consider females with CAH to be intersex, and oppose a legal intersex designation of females with CAH.

Incidence
According to most studies, the global incidence of classic forms range from about 1:14,000 to 1:18,000 births, based on newborn screening programs and national case registries, but this situation is more common in small genetically isolated populations with small gene pools. The incidence of nonclassical forms is 1:200 to 1:1000 based on various estimates, and is also higher in groups people with a high rate of marriage between relatives, up to 1:50.

See also 
 Inborn errors of steroid metabolism
 Congenital adrenal hyperplasia
 Adrenal insufficiency
 Disorders of sexual development
 Intersexuality, pseudohermaphroditism, and ambiguous genitalia
 21-Hydroxylase

References

External links 
 GeneReviews/NCBI/NIH/UW entry on 21-Hydroxylase-Deficient Congenital Adrenal Hyperplasia
 OMIM entry on 21-Hydroxylase-Deficient Congenital Adrenal Hyperplasia

Autosomal recessive disorders
Congenital disorders of endocrine system
Endocrine-related cutaneous conditions
Intersex variations